Nova Solis is rock band Morgan's first album, released in 1972.

Track listing
All tracks composed by Morgan Fisher (music) and Tim Staffell (lyrics), apart from "Alone" (music and lyrics by Staffell); "Nova Solis" - a side-length suite - includes "Jupiter" (excerpt; by Gustav Holst) and "May I Remember" and "Earth" (music and lyrics by Staffell) by Staffell's earlier band, Smile.

"Samarkhand the Golden" - 8:05
"Alone" - 5:20
"War Games" - 7:05
"Nova Solis" - 20:24
 "Theme"
 "Floating"
 "Take-Off"
 "Asteroids"
 "Earth"
 "Hyperspace: The Return Home"
 "Nova"
 "May I Remember"
 "Theme"

Personnel
Morgan
Morgan Fisher - organ, electric and acoustic pianos, synthesizers, Mellotron, spinet, finger cymbals
Tim Staffell - vocals, acoustic guitar, tambourine, timpani
Bob Sapsed - fretless bass
Maurice Bacon - drums, percussion, gong

References

1972 debut albums
RCA Records albums